Radio Studio 99 is a Bosnian commercial radio station, broadcasting from Sarajevo, Bosnia and Herzegovina. It was founded by Adil Kulenović and Zoran Ilić.

Radio Studio 99 broadcasts news and talk show programs from the parent TV channels Al Jazeera Balkans. The program is currently broadcast at one frequency (Sarajevo ), and estimated number of potential listeners is around 443,685. Independent Radio Studio 99 is owned by the Al Jazeera Balkans.

Frequencies
The program is currently broadcast on 2 frequencies:

 Sarajevo  
 Fojnica

See also 
List of radio stations in Bosnia and Herzegovina

References

External links 
 Official website
 Communications Regulatory Agency of Bosnia and Herzegovina

Sarajevo
Mass media in Sarajevo